Altenkirchen is a town in Rhineland-Palatinate, Germany, capital of the district of Altenkirchen. It is located approximately 40 km east of Bonn and 50 km north of Koblenz. Altenkirchen is the seat of the Verbandsgemeinde ("collective municipality") Altenkirchen-Flammersfeld.

Population development

Geography
Lahrer Herrlichkeit, a landscape region in the collective municipality of Flammersfeld

Notable people

 Dirk Adorf (born 1969), race car driver
 Sabine Bätzing-Lichtenthäler (born 1975), politician (SPD)
 Dittmar Hahn (born 1943), former judge of the Federal Administrative Court
 Claus Koch (born 1953), jazz musician
 Ernst Lindemann (1894–1941), an officer of the Imperial Navy and later the Navy commander of the battleship  Bismarck 
 Hermann Heinrich Traut (born 1866), librarian
 Marie Gülich (born 1994), WNBA player.

Other personalities
The following figures are not native Altenkirchen people, but have worked or lived in the city:

 Wilhelm Boden (1890–1961), former Prime Ministers of Rheinland-Pfalz
 Ludwig Julius Budge (1811–1888), physician
 Bernhard Grzimek (1909–1987), zoologist, cooperated in 1938 with the District Veterinary Office in Altenkirchen to combat bovine tuberculosis
 François Séverin Marceau (1769–1796), French general
 Krzysztof Meyer (born 1943), composer
 Hans Nüsslein (1910–1991), German tennis player, professional world champion in 1933, 1936, 1937
 Friedrich Wilhelm Raiffeisen (1818–1888), social reformer
 Ewald Schnug sen. (1930–2013), Master Gardener, Bearer of the Federal Cross of Merit, First Alderman of Altenkirchen, Gamekeeper's ring leader, County hunting master
 Ewald Schnug (* 1954), agricultural researcher, professor, Honorary-President of the International Scientific Center for Fertilizers

References

Altenkirchen (district)